Francis Ford (born Francis Joseph Feeney; August 14, 1881 – September 5, 1953) was an American film actor, writer and director. He was the mentor and elder brother of film director John Ford. He also appeared in many of the latter's movies, including Young Mr. Lincoln (1939) and The Quiet Man (1952).

Biography 

Ford was born in Portland, Maine. He was the son of John Augustine Feeney, who was born in the village of Spiddal, County Galway, Ireland, on June 15, 1854. His mother was Barbara "Abbey" Curran. By 1878, John had moved to Portland, Maine, and opened a saloon, at 42 Center Street, that used a false front to pose as grocery store. John opened four others in following years.

After service in the United States Army in the Spanish–American War (In Pappy: The Life of John Ford, Dan Ford wrote about Francis Ford and the war, "The Army soon discovered that he was only fifteen and sent him home."), Francis left home. He drifted into the film business in New York City, working for David Horsley, Al Christie and the Star Film Company's San Antonio operation under Gaston Méliès. He adopted the name Ford from the automobile. From San Antonio, Francis began his Hollywood career working for Thomas H. Ince at Ince's Bison studio, directing and appearing in westerns.

Ford's younger brother, John M. Feeney, nicknamed "Bull," was a successful fullback and defensive tackle on a Portland High state championship football team. In 1914, "Bull" followed Francis to Hollywood, changed his name to John Ford and eventually surpassed his elder brother's considerable reputation.

Ford's son, Philip Ford, was also a film actor/director. Ford died after being diagnosed with cancer.

Work 

Ford may have acted in over 400 films, with many of his early credits poorly documented and probably lost.

Ambitious and prolific, in Ford's early work he cast himself as George Armstrong Custer, Sherlock Holmes (with his younger brother as Dr. Watson) and Abraham Lincoln, a role in which he specialized. By 1912, Ford was directing alongside Thomas Ince. It rapidly became clear that Ince was routinely taking credit for Ford's work, so Ford moved to Universal in early 1913. His 1913 Lucille Love, Girl of Mystery was Universal's first serial, and the first of a string of very popular serials starring Ford's collaborator and lover Grace Cunard. The 1915 serial The Broken Coin was expanded from 15 to 22 episodes by popular demand, probably the height of Ford's career.

In 1917, Ford founded a short-lived independent company, Fordart Films, which released the 1918 Berlin via America with Phil Kelly, and briefly opened his own studio at Sunset Boulevard and Gower Street. At the same time, Ford mentored his younger brother, collaborating frequently as writers, directors and actors in each other's projects, but as early as 1917, it was clear that John's star was on the rise. Frank's directorial style remained suitable for serials, but failed to evolve. Ford's final known directoral credit is for the 1928 The Call of the Heart, a 50-minute vehicle for "Dynamite the Devil Dog".

The Ford brothers were, at the best of times, critical of each other and sometimes sharply antagonistic. Ford wrote an unpublished memoir in 1934 called Up and Down the Ladder which is "filled with bitter and sometimes heartrending complaints about how old-timers who had helped create the industry had been shunted aside by younger men." 
From the late 1920s, and for the next two decades, Ford sustained a career as a grizzled character actor and bit player. He is often uncredited, as in his appearance in James Whale's 1931 Frankenstein. Among his most memorable roles was that of the demented old man in The Ox-Bow Incident (1943).

Selected filmography

The Immortal Alamo (1911, Short) – Navarre
The Deserter (actor, 1912, Short) – The Deserter
Custer's Last Fight (actor and director, 1912) – General George A. Custer
The Post Telegrapher (director, 1912, Short) – Bob Evans – the Post Telegrapher
The Invaders (actor and director, 1912) – Colonel James Bryson
When Lincoln Paid (actor and director, 1913, Short) – Abraham Lincoln
The Battle of Bull Run (1913)  – Abraham Lincoln
Lucille Love, Girl of Mystery (writer, director and star, 15-episode serial, 1914) – Hugo Loubeque
The Adventures of Shorty (director, 1914, and some of the subsequent "Shorty" two-reelers through 1917)
A Study in Scarlet (actor and director, 1914, Short) – Sherlock Holmes
The Mysterious Rose (1914)
The Heart of Maryland (1915) – Abraham Lincoln
The Broken Coin (actor and director, 22-episode serial, 1915) – Count Frederick
Three Bad Men and a Girl (1915)
The Adventures of Peg o' the Ring (actor and director, 15-episode serial, 1916) – Dr. Lund, Junior
The Bandit's Wager (director, 1916, Short) – Nan's Brother / The Bandit
The Purple Mask (1916) – Phil Kelly / The Sphinx
John Ermine of Yellowstone (director, 1917) – John Ermine
The Mystery Ship (1917)
Who Was the Other Man? (1917)
The Dazzling Miss Davison (actor, 1917)
Motherhood (actor, 1917)
John Ermine of the Yellowstone (1917)
The Greater Woman (actor, 1917)
The Mirror (actor, 1917)
The Tornado (writer, 1917)
The Avenging Trail (director, 1917)
Berlin via America (director, 1918) – Phil Kelly
The Craving (writer, director and star, 1918) – Carroll Wayles
The Silent Mystery (actor and director, 15-episode serial, 1918) – Phil Kelly
The Isle of Intrigue (1918)
The Mystery of 13 (actor and director, 15-episode serial, 1919) – Phil Kelly / Jim Kelly
Crimson Shoals (1919) – Jack Quinn, the son / Frederick Fielding, the father / Thomas Fielding, the grandfather
The Woman of Mystery (1920)
Thunderbolt Jack (director, 10-episode serial, 1920)
A Man from Nowhere (1920) – The Town Drunkard
The Great Reward (director, producer, star, 15-episode serial, 1921) – The American Adventurer
Action (actor, 1921) – Soda Water Manning
 The Lady from Longacre (1921) – Count de Freitas
The Stampede (1921) – Robert Wagner
 Cyclone Bliss (1921)
So This Is Arizona (1922) – Ned Kendall
 Another Man's Boots (1922) – The Stranger
 Thundering Hoofs (1922) – Daddy Bill / 'Colonel' Bill
They're Off (1922) – Col. Blake
Bells of San Juan (1922) – Minor Role (uncredited)
Storm Girl (1922) – Dr. Blake
 Angel Citizens (1922)
The Village Blacksmith (actor, 1922) – Asa Martin
The Boss of Camp 4 (1922) – Dude McCormick
The Fighting Skipper (actor and director, 15-episode serial, 1923)
Three Jumps Ahead (actor, 1923) – Ben McLean
Haunted Valley (actor, 15-episode serial, 1923) – Sharkey
 Mine to Keep (1923) – Jack Deering
Western Feuds (1924) – J.P. Hartley
A Rodeo Mixup (1924) – Her Uncle
Western Yesterdays (1924) – Twitchie
In the Days of the Covered Wagon (1924)
Hearts of Oak (actor, 1924)
The Measure of a Man (1924) – 'Pale' Peter
The Diamond Bandit (1924) – Friar Aloysius
Cupid's Rustler (1924)
Soft Shoes (actor, 1925) – Quig Mundy
The Sign of the Cactus (1925) – Panhandle George
A Roaring Adventure (1925) – Colonel Burns / Bennett Hardy
The Taming of the West (1925) – Frosty Miller
 Scar Hanan (1925) – Jury foreman
The Power God (serial, 1925) – Government Secret Service Man (Chapter 15) (uncredited)
 Ridin' Thunder (1925) – Frank Douglas
The Red Rider (1925) – Brown Bear
Perils of the Wild (director, 15-episode serial, 1925)
The Fighting Heart (actor, 1925) – Town Fool
The Four from Nowhere (1925)
Officer 444 (writer and director, 10-episode serial, 1926) – Fire Chief
Lash of the Whip (1926) – 'Hurricane' Smith
Speed Cop (actor, 1926)
The Winking Idol (director, 10-chapter serial, 1926)
Wolf's Trail (1927)
Wolves of the Air (1927)
Upstream (actor, 1927) – Juggler
Men of Daring (1927) – Black Roger
The Devil's Saddle (1927) – Pete Hepburn
The Heart of Maryland (actor, 1927) – Jefferson Davis
The Cruise of the Hellion (1927) – Peg-leg
The Wreck of the Hesperus (actor, 1927) – John Hazzard
Uncle Tom's Cabin (1927) – Captain (uncredited)
One Glorious Scrap (1927) – Ralph Curtis
The Branded Sombrero (1928) – Link Jarvis
The Trail of '98 (actor, 1928) – Gold Commissioner's Assistant (uncredited)
The Four-Footed Range (1928) – Brom Hockley
The Chinatown Mystery (1928) – The Sphinx
Sisters of Eve (1928) – Pritchard
The Call of the Heart (director, 1928)
The Charlatan (1929) – Detective (uncredited)
The Black Watch (1929) – Maj. MacGregor (uncredited)
The Lariat Kid (actor, 1929) – Cal Gregg
The Drake Case (1929) – Juror (uncredited)
Mister Antonio (1929) – Bit Role (uncredited)
The Mounted Stranger (1930) – 'Spider' Coy
The Jade Box (actor, 10-chapter serial, 1930) – Martin Morgan
Captain of the Guard (1930) – Hussars Officer (uncredited)
Kathleen Mavourneen (1930) – James, the butler
Song of the Caballero (1932) – Don Pedro Madero
Sons of the Saddle (1930) – 'Red' Slade
Abraham Lincoln (actor, 1930) – Sheridan's Aide (uncredited)
The Indians Are Coming (1930) – George Woods / Tom Woods
Resurrection (1931) – Drunken Soldier on Train (uncredited)
Seas Beneath (1931) – Eric (Captain of Trawler) (uncredited)
The Front Page (1931) – Carl – a Detective (uncredited)
A Free Soul (actor, 1931) – Skid Row Drunk (uncredited)
The Spirit of Notre Dame (1931) – Alumnus (uncredited)
Possessed (actor, 1931) – Drunken Husband (uncredited)
Frankenstein (actor, 1931) – Hans (uncredited)
Battling with Buffalo Bill (serial, 1931) – Jim Rodney
The Last Ride (actor, 1931) – Brady
Discarded Lovers (1932) – Medical Examiner (uncredited)
The Impatient Maiden (1932) – InsanMatt Higginse Asylum Warden (uncredited)
Scarface (1932) – Prison Guard (alternative ending) (uncredited)
Scandal for Sale (1932) – Belmont Hotel Desk Clerk (uncredited)
Destry Rides Again (actor, 1932) – Judd Ogden
The Rider of Death Valley (1932) – Gabe
Tangled Fortunes (1932)
Heroes of the West (actor, 12-chapter serial, 1932) – Cavalry Captain
Jungle Mystery (actor, 12-chapter serial, 1932)
Air Mail (1932) – Passenger Who'll Die on a Train (uncredited)
The Lost Special (actor, 12-chapter serial, 1932) – Botter Hood
Clancy of the Mounted (actor, 12-chapter serial, 1933) – Inspector Cabot
The Thundering Herd (1933) – Frank (uncredited)
Life in the Raw (1933) – Sheriff Myles
Pilgrimage (actor, 1933) – Mayor Elmer Briggs
The Man from Monterey (1933) – Don Pablo Gonzales
Gordon of Ghost City (actor, 12-chapter serial, 1933) – Mystery Man
Doctor Bull (1933) – Mr. Herring, Metting Chairman (uncredited)
Charlie Chan's Greatest Case (actor, 1933) – Captain Hallett
Roman Scandals (actor, 1933) – Roman Citizen (uncredited)
Smoky (1933) – Horse Buyer (uncredited)
Pirate Treasure (1934) – Dick's Friend at the Airfield
The Lost Patrol (1934) – Arab (uncredited)
Sleepers East (1934) – Well-Wisher at Train Station (uncredited)
Cheaters (actor, 1934)
Murder in Trinidad (actor, 1934) – Davenant
The World Moves On (1934) – Legionnaire in Trench (uncredited)
Charlie Chan's Courage (actor, 1934) – Hewitt
Judge Priest (actor, 1934) – Juror No. 12
Bachelor of Arts (1934) – Pawnbroker (uncredited)
The County Chairman (1935) – Cattle Rancher
The Whole Town's Talking (1935) – Newspaper Reporter at Dock (uncredited)
Goin' to Town (1935) – Sheriff (uncredited)
The Informer (1935) – 'Judge' Flynn
Paris in Spring (actor, 1935) – Drunken Peasant (uncredited)
The Arizonian (actor, 1935) – Mayor Ed Comstock
Steamboat Round the Bend (actor, 1935) – Efe
This Is the Life (1935) – 'Sticky' Jones
Charlie Chan's Secret (1936) – Captain of Salvage Ship (uncredited)
Paddy O'Day (actor, 1936) – Tom McGuire – Immigration Officer
The Prisoner of Shark Island (actor, 1936) – Cpl. O'Toole
Charlie Chan at the Circus (actor, 1936) – John Gaines
Gentle Julia (1936) – Tubbs, Fish Peddler
Educating Father (1936) – Sheriff Hart
Little Miss Nobody (1936) – Detective (uncredited)
Sins of Man (actor, 1936) – Town Drunk
The Plainsman (actor, 1936) – Anderson – Old Veteran (uncredited)
The Plough and the Stars (1936) – (uncredited)
A Star Is Born (1937) – William Gregory (uncredited)
The Road Back (1937) – Street Cleaner (uncredited)
The Last Train from Madrid (actor, 1937) – Pedro Elias (uncredited)
Slave Ship (actor, 1937) – Scraps
The Prisoner of Zenda (actor, 1937) – (scenes deleted)
Checkers (1937) – Daniel Snodgrass
Mannequin (1937) – Tim O'Rourke (uncredited)
In Old Chicago (actor, 1938) – Driver
Change of Heart (1938) – Dog Pound Man (uncredited)
The Girl of the Golden West (1938) – Miner (uncredited)
Kentucky Moonshine (actor, 1938) – Grandpa Hatfield
The Texans (actor, 1938) – Uncle Dud
The Great Waltz (actor, 1938)
Stagecoach (1939) – Sergeant Billy Pickett (uncredited)
Young Mr. Lincoln (1939) – Sam Boone (uncredited)
Colorado Sunset (1939) – The Drunk (uncredited)
Bad Lands (1939) – Charlie Garth
Drums Along the Mohawk (1939) – Joe Boleo
Geronimo (1939) – Scout (uncredited)
The Grapes of Wrath (1940) – Migrant (uncredited)
The Man from Dakota (1940) – Horseman on Bridge (uncredited)
Viva Cisco Kid (1940) – Proprietor
Lucky Cisco Kid (1940) – Court Clerk
Three Faces West (1940) – Farmer Bill (uncredited)
South of Pago Pago (actor, 1940) – Foster
Diamond Frontier (actor, 1940)
Romance of the Rio Grande (1941) – Stagecoach Driver (uncredited)
Western Union (1941) – Eastbound Stagecoach Driver (uncredited)
Tobacco Road (actor, 1941) – Vagabond on Road (uncredited)
The Last of the Duanes (actor, 1941) – Luke Stevens
Riders of the Purple Sage (1941) – Inebriated Courtroom Spectator (uncredited)
They Died with Their Boots On (1941) – Veteran (uncredited)
The Vanishing Virginian (1942) – Campaign Committee Member (uncredited)
The Man Who Wouldn't Die (1942) – Caretaker
The Loves of Edgar Allan Poe (actor, 1942) – Tavern Keeper
King of the Mounties (serial, 1942) – Zeke Collins (Ch. 4)
Outlaws of Pine Ridge (actor, 1942) – Bartender
The Ox-Bow Incident (actor, 1943) – Alva 'Dad' Hardwicke (uncredited)
Girls in Chains (1943) – Jury Foreman (uncredited)
The Desperadoes (1943) – Hank (uncredited)
Jitterbugs (actor, 1943) – Skeptical Old-Timer (uncredited)
Home in Indiana (1944) – Ed – Seated Opposite J.T. in Bar (uncredited)
Wilson (1944) – Hughes Campaign Orator (uncredited)
The Big Noise (actor, 1944) – Train Station Attendant (uncredited)
The Climax (1944) – Backstage Attendant (uncredited)
The Princess and the Pirate (1944) – Drunken Pirate (uncredited)
Bowery Champs (actor, 1944) – Sports Writer (uncredited)
The Big Bonanza (1944) – Daley (uncredited)
Mom and Dad (1945) – Dr. Rubin
Hangover Square (actor, 1945) – Ogilby – Fulham Antique Dealer (uncredited)
Murder, He Says (1945) – Lee – Old Townsman (uncredited)
The White Gorilla (1945) – Mr. Stacey
Wildfire (actor, 1945) – Ezra Mills
Incendiary Blonde (1945) – Ranch Owner (uncredited)
State Fair (1945) – R.C. Martin (uncredited)
Love, Honor and Goodbye (1945) – Old Sea Dog (uncredited)
San Antonio (1945) – Old Cowboy Greeting Coach (uncredited)
The Wife of Monte Cristo (1946) – (uncredited)
Renegades (1946) – Eph (uncredited)
Sister Kenny (1946) – Patrick O'Shea (uncredited)
Accomplice (actor, 1946) – King Connors
My Darling Clementine (1946) – Dad (Old Soldier) (uncredited)
Wake Up and Dream (1946) – Old Man at Counter (uncredited)
California (1947) – Jessie (uncredited)
Gunfighters (1947) – Cook (uncredited)
High Tide (1947) – Pop Garrow
Driftwood (actor, 1947) – Abner Green
Unconquered (1947) – Frontiersman on Fort Pitt Roof (uncredited)
Bandits of Dark Canyon (1947) – Horse Trader
Fort Apache (1948) – Fen (Stage Guard) (uncredited)
The Timber Trail (1948) – Ralph Baker
Feudin', Fussin' and A-Fightin' (1948) – Race Checker / Fisherman (uncredited)
Eyes of Texas (actor, 1948) – Thad Cameron
The Plunderers (actor, 1948) – Barnaby
3 Godfathers (1948) – Drunken Old-Timer at Bar (uncredited)
The Far Frontier (1948) – Alf Sharper
Frontier Investigator (1949) – Ed Garnett
She Wore a Yellow Ribbon (1949) – Connelly (Fort Starke Barman) (uncredited)
San Antone Ambush (1949) – Maj. Farnsworth
Wagon Master (1950) – Mr. Peachtree
Father Makes Good (1950) – Fisherman
The Quiet Man (1952) – Dan Tobin
Toughest Man in Arizona (1952) – Hanchette
The Lawless Breed (1953) – Charlie – Saloon Janitor (uncredited)
The Sun Shines Bright (actor, 1953) – Feeney – Old Backwoodsman
It Happens Every Thursday (actor, 1953) – Elderly Man (uncredited)
The Marshal's Daughter (actor, 1953) – Gramps (uncredited) (final film role)

Television
The Lone Ranger – episode "Gold Fever" – Sam Dingle (1950) 
The Living Bible – TV series – Samaritan Leper (1952)

References

External links

 
 
 Early portrait of Francis Ford (moviecard)
 Literature on Francis Ford

1881 births
1953 deaths
American male film actors
American male silent film actors
American film directors
American people of Irish descent
Burials at Holy Cross Cemetery, Culver City
20th-century American male actors
Male actors from Portland, Maine
Male Western (genre) film actors